Maciej Świątkowski (born 16 March 1950 in Bydgoszcz) is a Polish politician. He was elected to Sejm on 25 September 2005, getting 8780 votes in 4 Bydgoszcz district as a candidate from Civic Platform list.

He was also a member of Senate 1997-2001.

See also
Members of Polish Sejm 2005-2007

External links
Maciej Świątkowski - parliamentary page - includes declarations of interest, voting record, and transcripts of speeches.

1950 births
Living people
Civic Platform politicians
Members of the Senate of Poland 1997–2001
Members of the Polish Sejm 2005–2007
Members of Bydgoszcz City Council